A leadership election for the Civic Democratic Party (ODS)  was held on 18 November 1994 in Karlovy Vary. Václav Klaus was elected for another 1-year term. He received 266 votes of 275.

References

1994
1994 elections in the Czech Republic
Single-candidate elections
Civic Democratic Party leadership election